Robert Burdett (by 1510 – 11 January 1549), of Bramcote, Warwickshire, was an English politician.

He was a Member (MP) of the Parliament of England for Leicester in 1542, Leicestershire in 1545 and Warwickshire in 1547.

References

1549 deaths
Members of the Parliament of England for Leicestershire
People from Nuneaton and Bedworth (district)
Year of birth uncertain
English MPs 1542–1544
English MPs 1545–1547
English MPs 1547–1552